

Chronological list
1957 — Communist Party of Germany, Reimann and Fisch v. Germany
1998 — United Communist Party of Turkey and Others v. Turkey
1998 — Socialist Party and Others v. Turkey
1999 — Freedom and Democracy Party (ÖZDEP) v. Turkey
2002 — Dicle for the Democratic Party (DEP) of Turkey v. Turkey
2002 — Yazar and Others v. Turkey
2003 — Socialist Party of Turkey (STP) and Others v. Turkey
2003 — Refah Partisi and Others v. Turkey
2004 — Gorzelik v. Poland
2004 — Vatan v. Russia
2004 — Presidential Party of Mordovia v. Russia
2005 — Partidul Comunistilor (Nepeceristi) and Ungureanu v. Romania
2005 — Democracy and Change Party and Others v. Turkey
2005 — United Macedonian Organisation Ilinden – PIRIN and Others v. Bulgaria
2005 — Emek Partisi v. Turkey
2006 — Fazilet Partisi and Kutan v. Turkey
2006 — Artyomov v. Russia 
2007 — Demokratik Kitle Partisi and Elçi v. Turkey
2009 — Herri Batasuna and Batasuna v. Spain
2010 — HADEP and Demir v. Turkey
2011 — Republican party of Russia v. Russia 
2013 — Eusko Abertzale Ekintza — Acción Nacionalista Vasca (EAE-ANV) v. Spain (No. 2) (application No. 40959/09)
2016 — Demokratik Toplum Partisi and 6 other applications v. Turkey (no. 3840/10)

List by issue

Left-wing parties
1957 — Communist Party of Germany, Reimann and Fisch v. Germany
1998 — United Communist Party of Turkey and Others v. Turkey
2005 — Partidul Comunistilor (Nepeceristi) and Ungureanu v. Romania

Ethnic-based parties
2004 — Gorzelik v. Poland
2004 — Vatan v. Russia
2005 — United Macedonian Organisation Ilinden – PIRIN and Others v. Bulgaria
2006 — Artyomov v. Russia

Federalist and separatist parties
1998 — Socialist Party and Others v. Turkey
1999 — Freedom and Democracy Party (ÖZDEP) v. Turkey
2002 — Dicle for the Democratic Party (DEP) of Turkey v. Turkey
2002 — Yazar and others v. Turkey
2003 — Socialist Party of Turkey (STP) and Others v. Turkey
2005 — Democracy and Change Party and Others v. Turkey
2005 — Emek Partisi v. Turkey
2007 — Demokratik Kitle Partisi and Elçi v. Turkey
2009 — Herri Batasuna and Batasuna v. Spain
2010 — HADEP and Demir v. Turkey
2013 — Eusko Abertzale Ekintza — Acción Nacionalista Vasca (EAE-ANV) v. Spain (No. 2)
2016 — Demokratik Toplum Partisi and 6 other applications v. Turkey

Religious parties
2003 — Refah Partisi and Others v. Turkey
2006 — Fazilet Partisi and Kutan v. Turkey

Other issues
2004 — Presidential Party of Mordovia v. Russia
2011 — Republican party of Russia v. Russia

References

External links
Factsheet – Political parties and associations ECHR, June 2014

Article 11 of the European Convention on Human Rights
European Court of Human Rights case law
Political parties
European Court of Human Rights cases involving Turkey